Sakin Begmatovna Begmatova (1921-1981) was a Soviet-Kyrgyzstani Politician (Communist).

She served as Minister of Foreign Affairs from 1963 to 1980.

References

1921 births
1981 deaths
20th-century Kyrgyzstani women politicians
20th-century Kyrgyzstani politicians
Soviet women in politics
Kyrgyzstani communists
Women government ministers of Kyrgyzstan